Aaron Kershaw (born 22 October 1992) is a field hockey player from Australia.

Personal life
Aaron Kershaw was born and raised in Goulburn, New South Wales.

His pre-game pump-up song is The Horses by Daryl Braithwaite.

Career

Club level
In Hockey ACT's 'National League One', Kershaw plays hockey for Goulburn Hockey Club.

Over a period of three years, from 2015 to 2017, Kershaw was awarded the 'Brophy Medal' back to back. The award is presented to the best and fairest of the competition.

State level
Despite coming from New South Wales, Kershaw represents the Australian Capital Territory in domestic competitions.

Kershaw first represented the Canberra Lakers, the ACT's top men's side, at the Australian Hockey League (AHL) in 2011. Since his debut, Kershaw represented the team every year until 2018, when the AHL was disbanded.

In 2019, with the introduction of Hockey Australia's new national league, Hockey One, Kershaw was named captain of the ACT's new team, the Canberra Chill.

National level
Aaron Kershaw has only represented Australia at junior level, in the Under–21 division.

Kershaw made his debut for the 'Burras' in 2013, at the Australian Youth Olympic Festival where he won a gold medal. He followed this up with an appearance at the Junior World Cup, where Australia finished fifth.

References

External links
 
 

1992 births
Living people
Australian male field hockey players
Male field hockey defenders
People from Goulburn
Sportsmen from New South Wales